Free Expressions is a studio album by Jamaican reggae female singer Etana, released on February 8, 2011, under VP Records. Free Expressions is 14 new songs that display her unique brand of pop-reggae, soulful voicing and personal lyrics on progressive one drop riddims with rock flavored instrumentation. Etana's debut The Strong One (VP1800) garnered multiple hits and established Etana as a fresh new female voice on the international scene. Her sophomore effort will elevate her to an even broader audience with infectious hooks of "I Know You Love Me", "My Name Is" (a remake of the hit by Japanese artist Pushim), "Free" and the first single "Heart Broken".

Executive Producer
Chris Chin

Track List

References
 Sampler of Free Expressions/Etana VP Records. November 23, 2010.
 Preview Product Free Expressions/Etana VP Reggae. February 8, 2011.
 Article of Free Expressions The Jamaica Star.N/A.
 Release Detail reggaeville. February 7, 2011.
 Etana Returns with Free Expressions Jah Works. February 17, 2011.
 Article of Free Expression Dancehall.Mobi. February 8, 2011.
 Article of Free Expression Urban Islandz. November 26, 2010.
 Article of Free Expressions Caribbean New Yorker. November 23, 2010.

Etana (musician) albums
2011 albums